Feng Shuaihang (born 21 January 2001) is a Chinese footballer currently playing as a midfielder for Changchun Yatai.

Club career
Feng made his debut with Changchun Yatai in the 2019 China League One season.

Career statistics

Club
.

Notes

References

2001 births
Living people
Chinese footballers
China youth international footballers
Association football midfielders
China League One players
Changchun Yatai F.C. players